The Hunter 19-1 is an American trailerable sailboat that was designed as a day sailer and small cruising sailboat by the Hunter Design Team and first built in 1981.

The design was originally marketed by the manufacturer as the Hunter 19, but is now usually referred to as the Hunter 19-1 to differentiate it from the unrelated 1993 Hunter 19-2 design, which was also sold as the Hunter 19.

Production
The design was built by Hunter Marine in the United States between 1981 and 1983, but it is now out of production.

Design
The Hunter 19-1 is a recreational keelboat, built predominantly of fiberglass, with wood trim. It has a fractional sloop rig, a raked stem, a slightly reverse transom, a transom-hung rudder controlled by a tiller and a centerboard. It displaces .

The boat is normally fitted with a small outboard motor for docking and maneuvering. The design features a self-bailing cockpit, built-in outboard engine mount, a portable toilet and a cooler.

See also
List of sailing boat types

Related development
Hunter 19-2

Similar sailboats
Buccaneer 200
Cal 20
Catalina 18
Drascombe Lugger
Edel 540
Hunter 18.5
Hunter 19 (Europa)
Mercury 18
Mistral T-21
Naiad 18
Paceship 20
Sandpiper 565
Sanibel 18
San Juan 21
Siren 17
Typhoon 18

References

External links
Official brochure

Keelboats
1980s sailboat type designs
Sailing yachts
Trailer sailers
Sailboat type designs by Hunter Design Team
Sailboat types built by Hunter Marine